The International Council on Monuments and Sites (ICOMOS) is a professional association that works for the conservation and protection of cultural heritage places around the world. Now headquartered in Charenton-le-Pont, France, ICOMOS was founded in 1965 in Warsaw as a result of the Venice Charter of 1964, and offers advice to UNESCO on World Heritage Sites.

The idea behind ICOMOS dates to the Athens Conference on the restoration of historic buildings in 1931, organized by the International Museums Office. The Athens Charter of 1931 introduced the concept of international heritage. In 1964, the Second Congress of Architects and Specialists of Historic Buildings, meeting in Venice, adopted 13 resolutions. The first created the International Charter on the Conservation and Restoration of Monuments and Sites, better known as Venice Charter; the second, put forward by UNESCO, created ICOMOS to carry out this charter.

ICOMOS currently has over 10,100 individual members in 153 countries, 110 national committees and 28 international scientific committees. With rare exceptions, each member must be qualified in the field of conservation and a practicing landscape architect, architect, archaeologist, anthropologist, town planner, engineer, administrator of heritage, historian, art historian, palaeontologist or archivist.

ICOMOS is a partner and founding member of the Blue Shield, which works to protect the world's cultural heritage threatened by wars and natural disasters.

ICOMOS structure
ICOMOS is composed of its national committees (NCs), to which individuals and institutions apply for membership. In addition to the national committees, ICOMOS has a series of international scientific committees (ISCs), in which experts in a certain field of activity within the context of heritage conservation exchange views and debate.

The organization is headed by a president, five vice-presidents, a secretary-general and a treasurer all directly elected by the general assembly of the organization. 12 additional members are also elected by the General Assembly into the Executive Committee and five further members are co-opted into the executive board in order to represent regions of the world or areas of expertise that were not part of the executive committee following the elections. Ex officio members of the executive committee are the president of the advisory committee and the previous presidents of ICOMOS, who attend in advisory capacity. The executive committee is the executive body of ICOMOS.

The advisory committee is composed of the chairpersons of the national committees, the chairpersons of the international scientific committees and the president of ICOMOS as an ex officio member. The advisory committee was given the task to advise and make recommendations to the General Assembly and the Executive Committee on matters which concern policy and programme priorities.

National committees
National committees are subsidiary organizations created in the countries which are members of UNESCO. They bring together individual and institutional members and offer them a framework for discussion and an exchange of information. Each national committee adopts its own rules of procedure and elaborates its own program according to the goals and aims of ICOMOS. In 2021, ICOMOS has 107 national committees. ICOMOS website includes a list regularly updated.

International scientific committees
International scientific committees (ISCs) are entities focus on specialised areas of heritage conservation and are made up of members of the organisation drawn from those specialist areas.  The scientific programmes of the organisation are coordinated by the "scientific council" made up of the presidents of the ISCs. Nowadays, ICOMOS has 28 ISCs. A list regularly updated is available on ICOMOS website.

Working groups 
ICOMOS conducts a process of reflection on doctrine and good practice on current issues involving the conservation of cultural heritage. To this end, it sets up working groups made up of ICOMOS members who are heritage professionals: architects, archaeologists, professors and researchers, curators and scientists. The aim of these groups can be the drafting of a charter, the implementation of concrete activities (working sessions, workshops). There are currently 6 working groups, the list of which can be found on the ICOMOS website, in which experts reflect on a wide variety of subjects related to heritage conservation: indigenous heritage, sustainable development, Syria/Iraq, climate change and emerging professionals.

ICOMOS International Secretariat

Documentation Center 
Located at ICOMOS headquarters in Paris, it collects, analyses and disseminates information on all methods of heritage conservation, notably through its bibliographic database (14,000 references on the world's architectural heritage) and a large photo library containing more than 8,000 photographs. It is open for consultation to researchers, whether or not they are members of ICOMOS.

Publications 
The regular publications of ICOMOS International are: ICOMOS News, a newsletter for members, which provides an update on the activities of the association (quarterly in French, English and Spanish); the ICOMOS Scientific Journal, published twice a year, is a thematic journal ;

The regular publications of the French Section of ICOMOS are: Le Bulletin d’information d’Icomos France; Les Cahiers de la Section Française de l’ICOMOS ; Les Dossiers techniques ; Les Mémentos techniques ; les Bulletins (dossiers des colloques); Les Enquêtes de la section française.

ICOMOS charters and doctrinal texts
In the tradition of the Athens and Venice Charters, ICOMOS has, in the years since its formation, developed and adopted a number of other charters and doctrinal texts which provide guidance to heritage conservation professionals in their work.  Most such documents are created by the international committees of the organisation and thereafter adopted by the triennial General Assembly. The texts each address a specific area of professional practice in the heritage conservation professions. Following the 17th ICOMOS General Assembly held in Paris in November 2011, the list of charters is as follows:

 International Charter for the Conservation and Restoration of Monuments and Sites (Venice Charter), 1964
Historic Gardens (Florence Charter), 1981
 Charter for the Conservation of Historic Towns and Urban Areas (Washington Charter), 1987
 Charter for the Protection and Management of Archaeological Heritage, 1990
 Charter on the Protection and Management of Underwater Cultural Heritage, 1996
 International Cultural Tourism Charter – Managing Tourism at Places of Heritage Significance, 1999
 Principles for the Preservation of Timber Structures, 1999
 Charter on the Built Vernacular Heritage, 1999
 ICOMOS Charter –  Principles for the Analysis, Conservation and Structural Restoration of Architectural Heritage, 2003
 ICOMOS Principles for the Preservation and Conservation-Restoration of Wall Paintings, 2003
 ICOMOS Charter on Cultural Routes, 2008 
 ICOMOS Charter for the Interpretation and Presentation of Cultural Heritage Sites (also known as the 'Ename Charter'), 2008
 Joint ICOMOS – TICCIH Principles for the Conservation of Industrial Heritage Sites, Structures, Areas and Landscapes, 2011
 The Valletta Principles for the Safeguarding and Management of Historic Cities, Towns and Urban Areas, 2011 (Supersedes the Washington Charter)
 ICOMOS-IFLA principles concerning rural landscapes as heritage, 2017
 Document on historic urban public parks, 2017
 Salalah guidelines for the management of public archaeological sites, 2017
 Principles for the conservation of wooden built heritage, 2017

In addition to the above there is a list of seventeen other doctrinal texts, resolutions and declarations, including the Nara Document on Authenticity. In November 1994, at the Nara Conference on Authenticity, ICOMOS published the Nara Document on Authenticity, which addresses the need for a broader understanding of cultural diversity and cultural heritage in conservation efforts involving cultural heritage sites.

Many of the national committees of ICOMOS have adopted their own charters which set standards for heritage conservation practice at national level.

ICOMOS and the World Heritage Convention
In 1972, ICOMOS was named by the UNESCO World Heritage Convention as one of the three formal advisory bodies to the World Heritage Committee, along with the International Union for Conservation of Nature (IUCN) and the International Centre for the Study of the Preservation and Restoration of Cultural Property (ICCROM). As the professional and scientific adviser to the committee on all aspects of the cultural heritage, ICOMOS is responsible for the evaluation of all nominations of cultural properties made to the World Heritage List with the criteria laid down by the World Heritage Committee. In addition to the basic criterion of “outstanding universal value,” ICOMOS evaluates nominations for aspects related to authenticity, management, and conservation as specified in the World Heritage Convention.

The evaluation of nominations involves consultation between the wide-ranging expertise represented by the organization’s membership and its national and scientific committees. Members are also sent on expert missions to carry out on-site evaluations of nominated properties. This extensive consultation results in the preparation of detailed recommendations that are submitted to the World Heritage Committee at its annual meetings.

ICOMOS is also involved, through its International Secretariat and its national and scientific committees, in the preparation of reports on the state of conservation of properties inscribed on the World Heritage List. It advises the UNESCO World Heritage Centre on requests for technical assistance received from states that are party to (i.e. have ratified) the World Heritage Convention. ICOMOS maintains a full archive of nominations and reports at the documentation centre at its Paris headquarters.

Piero Gazzola award 
The Gazzola Prize was established in 1979 in memory of Piero Gazzola, one of the greatest defenders of the conservation and restoration of historic monuments and sites, and a founder of ICOMOS. The prize is awarded every three years at the General Assembly of ICOMOS to an individual or a group of people who have worked together and contributed with distinction to the aims and objectives of ICOMOS. The beneficiary must be a member of ICOMOS and is chosen by the Selection Committee itself elected by the ICOMOS Board. The Prize is a commemorative medal and diploma.

List of awardees
 1981 – Jean Trouvelot
 1984 – Stanislaw Lorentz
 1987 – Masuru Sekino
 1990 – Gertrud Tripp
 1993 – Bernard Feilden
 1996 – Ernest Allan Connally
 1999 – Roland Silva
 2002 – Cevat Erder
 2005 – Ann Webster Smith
 2008 – Carmen Añón Feliu
 2011 – Nobuo Ito
 2014 – Henry Cleere
 2017 – Saleh Lamei Mostafa
2020 – Amund Sinding-Larsen

List of ICOMOS General Assemblies, Presidents and Secretaries General

See also 
International Day For Monuments and Sites

References

External links 
 
 List of National Committees
 ICOMOS Database , unesco.org
 Friends of World Heritage Non-profit organization that identifies projects that support local tourism enterprises that can help alleviate poverty and conserve World Heritage sites.
 The Nara Document on Authenticity (1994)
The Blue Shield

Archaeological organizations
Organizations established in 1965
Heritage registers
Heritage organizations
International cultural organizations
Conservation and restoration organizations
1965 establishments in France
Organizations based in Paris
International organizations based in France
History organizations based in France